This is a summary of 1938 in music in the United Kingdom.

Events
June – at the International Society for Contemporary Music (ISCM) Festival in London Benjamin Britten meets Aaron Copland.
18 August – Benjamin Britten is the soloist at the first performance of his Piano Concerto, staged during the London Proms.
date unknown – the composer Ralph Vaughan Williams begins an affair with Ursula Wood.

Popular music
"The Biggest Aspidistra In The World" by Tommie Connor, W. G. Haines & James S. Hancock
"Boomps-A-Daisy", with words and music by Annette Mills
"Cinderella, Stay In My Arms" w. Jimmy Kennedy m. Michael Carr
"Dearest Love" w.m. Noël Coward
"I Went to a Marvelous Party" w.m. Noël Coward
"The Stately Homes Of England", with words and music by Noël Coward
"Where Are The Songs We Sung?" w.m. Noël Coward
 "You're What's The Matter With Me" w.m. Jimmy Kennedy and Michael Carr.  Introduced by Harry Richman and Evelyn Dall in the film Kicking the Moon Around.

Classical music: new works
Benjamin Britten – Piano Concerto, Op. 13 (original version)
Alan Bush – Piano Concerto, Op. 18, with baritone and male choir in last movement
Hamilton Harty – The Children of Lir
Herbert Howells – Hymnus Paradisi
Michael Tippett – Piano Sonata No. 1

Film and Incidental music
Louis Levy – Crackerjack, directed by Albert de Courville.
Ernest Irving – 
The High Command, starring Lionel Atwill, Lucie Mannheim and James Mason.
I See Ice, starring George Formby, Kay Walsh and Betty Stockfeld.
It's in the Air, starring George Formby, Polly Ward and Jack Hobbs.  Directed by Anthony Kimmins.

Musical theatre
26 January – The London production of Nine Sharp opens at The Little Theatre, to run for 405 performances.
16 March – The London production of Operette opens at His Majesty's Theatre after a short run in Manchester.
 6 July – Maritza aka Countess Maritza, London production opened at the Palace Theatre
 29 September – These Foolish Things London revue opened at the Palladium

Musical films
Around the Town, directed by Herbert Smith, starring Vic Oliver and Irene Ware.
Break the News, directed by René Clair, starring Jack Buchanan and Maurice Chevalier.
Kicking the Moon Around, directed by Walter Forde, starring Bert Ambrose and Evelyn Dall
Mountains O'Mourne, directed by Harry Hughes, starring René Ray and Niall MacGinnis.
My Irish Molly, directed by Alex Bryce, starring Binkie Stuart
Over She Goes, directed by Graham Cutts, starring Stanley Lupino and Claire Luce
Sailing Along, directed by Sonnie Hale, starring Jessie Matthews and Barry MacKay
Stepping Toes, directed by John Baxter, starring Hazel Ascot and Enid Stamp-Taylor
Thistledown, directed by Arthur B. Woods, starring Aino Bergö and Athole Stewart
 We're Going to Be Rich starring Gracie Fields, Victor McLaglen and Brian Donlevy

Births
18 March – Kenny Lynch, singer, songwriter and actor (died 2019)
31 March – Laurie Holloway, pianist and composer
27 May – Elizabeth Harwood, operatic soprano (died 1990)
1 July – Susan Maughan, singer 
26 August – Jet Black (The Stranglers)
20 September – Jane Manning, operatic soprano
5 October – Peter Aston, conductor and composer (died 2013)
28 October – Howard Blake, composer
31 December – Christopher Steel, composer (died 1991)

Deaths
1 February – Marie Dainton, actress and music hall performer, 56
9 March – Sydney Baynes, conductor, composer and bandleader, 59
18 March – Cyril Rootham, organist and composer, 62
18 April – Richard Runciman Terry, musicologist, 72
24 July – Marmaduke Barton, pianist and composer, 72
14 August – Sir Landon Ronald, conductor and composer, 65 
3 September – James Kendrick Pyne, organist and composer, 86
4 November – John Thomas Job, minister, hymn-writer and poet, 71
15 November – Viola Tree, actress, singer and playwright, 54 (pleurisy)

See also
 1938 in British television
 1938 in the United Kingdom
 List of British films of 1938

References

British Music, 1938 in
Music
British music by year
1930s in British music